Giles Wemmbley-Hogg Goes Off is a BBC Radio 4 comedy written by Marcus Brigstocke, Jeremy Salsby and Graeme Garden, produced by Pozzitive Television.

Format and history
The show follows the travel adventures of title character Giles Wemmbley-Hogg ("Two Ms, two Gs", full name: Giles Peter St John David Habakkuk St John Wemmbley-Hogg), a nice but somewhat dim upper class former public school boy (Charterhouse) played by co-writer Brigstocke. Giles is on a gap year before university, and he records his (mis)adventures with his portable digital recorder, in places such as Bolivia, India, and Egypt. Throughout the series he does somehow graduate, albeit with a 2:2 in Canadian Studies. Later episodes have followed Giles in his search for a job and his engagement to the fearsome Arabella (fondly known as Belly-Bells).

Themes in this comedy are Giles's naïveté, and small-mindedness, with his frequent (and usually inappropriate) comparisons with life back in his native Budleigh Salterton. In Giles' first broadcast incarnation, as a recurring character performed by Brigstocke on satirical radio show The Now Show, he is offensively boorish and unlikeable. However, in Giles Wemmbley-Hogg Goes Off he is a sympathetic fool and clearly does not mean any harm.  Broadly similar characters are Harry Enfield's Tim Nice-But-Dim, and P. G. Wodehouse's Bertie Wooster.  On 9 April 2006, Brigstocke appeared in BBC Radio 4's Classic Serial adaptation of The Code of the Woosters as Bertie Wooster with Andrew Sachs as Jeeves.

The show is sometimes available online in the 'Comedy and Quizzes' section of the BBC radio on-demand website. The series is often repeated on BBC Radio 4 Extra.

In July 2007 Giles appeared on BBC Four television in Giles Wemmbley-Hogg Goes to Glastonbury, which contained a mixture of material from throughout the history of the radio show and from the similarly titled Radio 4 episode which had been broadcast only the week previously.

Series 4 was first broadcast on Radio 4 starting on Monday 14 December 2009 at 11:30am.

One of the special features on Brigstocke's 2007 standup DVD Planet Corduroy is a one-man lecture given in character by Giles Wemmbley-Hogg.

After an eight-year gap Giles Wemmbley-Hogg returned for a special Brexit episode broadcast on BBC Radio 4 on 28 March 2019, the day before the United Kingdom was originally due to leave the European Union.

Episode list

Availability
Four episodes from the 1st Series (not the episodes 'Moscow' and 'Beijing') and the entire 2nd Series are available on CD, and series 1-5 are available at the iTunes Store.

References

External links

Giles Wemmbley-Hogg Goes Off at RadioListings

BBC Radio comedy programmes
Giles Wemmbley-Hogg Goes Off